Debra "Honey" Piazza (born April 24, 1951) is an American piano player. She is a founding member of the band Rod Piazza and the Mighty Flyers.

Background
Piazza was born in Fairfield, California on April 24, 1951. Her father was in the Air Force and her family moved to England for three years, when she was a child. There she started taking classical piano lessons at the age of four and pursued the lessons until the age of 16 after they had moved back to California. She enjoyed playing jam sessions with her friends, but she really discovered piano blues when she heard a record of Otis Spann. For the next two years she would practice extensively.

In 1972 she went to Chicago, and played with a number of blues musicians. After her return to California she saw a concert of Rod Piazza, who at the time was playing with a band called Bacon Fat. Being impressed with his music she arranged to meet him for an audition. As a result, she joined the band and has played with Rod Piazza ever since.

They got married several years later and reside in Riverside, California.

Discography

(Rod Piazza & the Mighty Flyers)
For The Chosen Who   -   2005
Keepin' It Real   -   2004
Beyond The Source   -   2001
Here and Now   -   1999
Tough and Tender   -   1997
Live at B.B. King's Club  -  1994
Alphabet Blues  -  1992
In The Dark  -  1991

References

External links
The Mighty Flyers' website

1952 births
Living people
American blues pianists
Boogie-woogie pianists
Blind Pig Records artists
Musicians from the San Francisco Bay Area
People from Fairfield, California
20th-century American pianists
20th-century American women pianists
21st-century American pianists
21st-century American women pianists